Various special elections for the Connecticut House of Representatives and Connecticut State Senate have and will be held in the U.S. state of Connecticut on various dates in 2021. Candidates for special elections in Connecticut are nominated through party conventions rather than party primaries.

State elections

Legislative

State Senate 27th district special election
A special election was held on March 2, 2021, to fill Connecticut's 27th State Senate district after incumbent Democrat Carlo Leone resigned on January 5, 2021. The election was won by Democrat Patricia Billie Miller.

House of Representatives 112th district special election
A special election was held on April 13, 2021, to fill Connecticut's 112th House of Representatives district after incumbent Republican J.P. Sredzinski resigned on February 17, 2021. The election was won by Republican Tony Scott.

House of Representatives 145th district special election
A special election was held on April 27, 2021, to fill Connecticut's 145th House of Representatives district after incumbent Democrat Patricia Miller resigned on March 8, 2021, after winning a special election to the Connecticut State Senate. The election was won by Democrat Corey Paris.

State Senate 36th district special election
A special election was held on August 17, 2021, to fill Connecticut's 36th State Senate district after incumbent Democrat Alexandra Kasser resigned on June 22, 2021. Democrats nominated Alexis Gevanter, while Republicans nominated Ryan Fazio. John Blankely, a Democrat, ran as an independent, acting as a spoiler for Gevanter. Fazio ended up defeating Gevanter by 458 votes (2.9%), while Blankley earned 408 votes (only 50 votes less than Fazio’s winning margin). This was the first legislative flip of the 2021 United States elections.

See also
2021 United States state legislative elections

References

 
Connecticut